The 1920 Birthday Honours were appointments by King George V to various orders and honours to reward and highlight good works by citizens of the British Empire. The appointments were made to celebrate the official birthday of The King, and were published in The London Gazette on 4 June 1920.

Prince Albert, the future King George VI, led the honours list as the only new peer, being invested as the Duke of York, while more than 60 men were knighted.

The recipients of honours are displayed here as they were styled before their new honour, and arranged by honour, with classes (Knight, Knight Grand Cross, etc.) and then divisions (Military, Civil, etc.) as appropriate.

United Kingdom and British Empire

Duke, Earl, Baron
His Royal Highness Prince Albert Frederick Arthur George  as Baron Killarney, Earl of Inverness and Duke of York

Privy Councillor
The King appointed the following to His Majesty's Most Honourable Privy Council of the United Kingdom:

Frederick George Kellaway  one of the Parliamentary Secretaries to the Ministry of Munitions, December, 1916. Parliamentary and Financial Secretary to Ministry, 1918. Parliamentary Secretary and Deputy Minister, 1919. Member of Parliament for Bedford, 1910, and for Bedford Division, 1918. For Parliamentary Services
The Hon. François Stephanus Malan, Minister of Agriculture, Mines, Industries and Education, Union of South Africa. Acted as Prime Minister for eight months during General Botha's absence.

The King appointed the following to His Majesty's Most Honourable Privy Council of Ireland:

Stanley Baldwin  Financial Secretary to the Treasury since 1917
Hugh Thom Barrie  Vice-President, Irish Department of Agriculture
The Hon. Justice John Blake Powell  Judge of the High Court of Justice in Ireland. Former Solicitor-General for Ireland.

Baronetcies
John Anderson, Managing Director of Messrs. P. & W. A. Anderson, Ltd. For Public Services
William Henry Aykroyd  Partner in the Firm of Messrs. T. F. Firth & Sons, Brighouse. For Public and Local Services
Capt. Ion Hamilton Benn  Member of Parliament for Greenwich since 1910. Member of Port of London Authority
John Wyndham Beynon, Chairman South Wales Coal Owners Association. For Public Services.
Sir Ernest William Glover, Director of the Ship Management Branch of the Ministry of Shipping
The Rt. Hon. Thomas Frederick Halsey  Member of Parliament for Hertfordshire, 1874-1906
Sir Howard George Frank  Director-General of Lands, War Office, Air Ministry, and Ministry of Munitions. Chairman of Disposals Board
Peter Jeffrey Mackie  Deputy Lieutenant for Argyll, Ayr and Lanark. Has travelled extensively and written on Tariff Reform, Imperial Federation, and other political subjects. In 1918 made a gift of Pedigree Cattle to Rhodesia in order to encourage ranching and cattle breeding. Financed the Mackie Anthropological Expedition to Uganda
Archibald Mitchelson, Chairman of Messrs. D. Davies & Sons, the Admiralty Collieries, Wharncliffe Collieries and Yorkshire Collieries. For Public and Local Services
Arthur Francis Pease  late Second Civil Lord of the Admiralty
Frank Bernard Sanderson, Controller of Trench Warfare, National Filling Factories and Stores during the War. For Public Services.
Milton Sheridan Sharp, Chairman of Bradford Dyers Association. For Public and Local Services.
Sir George Frederick Sleight, largest Trawler Owner in the World. At the commencement of the War practically all his ships were commandeered by the Government for Mine Sweeping and Patrol purposes
Herbert Smith, Member of Board of Control of Wool and Textile Industries. Chairman of Carpet Trade Rationing Committee. Chairman of Man Power and Protection Committee. For Public Services
William Reardon Smith, Principal of St. Just Steamship Co., Leeds Shipping Co., and the Cornborough Shipping Line. For Public and Local Services
John Henderson Stewart  Partner of Messrs. Alexander Stewart & Son, of Dundee, Deputy Chairman of Sheffield Steel Products. Freeman of the City of London. For Public Services
Philip Sidney Stott, Prominent in Lancashire business life. President of the Oldham Lyceum (a non-political institution)
Sir George Alexander Touche, Member of Parliament for North Islington, 1910-1918
General Sir Reginald Wingate  For long and Distinguished Public Services

Knight Bachelor

Sidney Robert Alexander  Mayor of Faversham 1908-1919. Public and municipal services
Hugh Percy Allen  Director of the Royal College of Music
Professor Frederick William Andrewes  Pathologist at St. Bartholomew's Hospital. For valuable work in medical research.
Capt. David Wilson Barker, Captain Superintendent of the Training Ship Worcester
Sydney Beauchamp, Resident Medical Officer to British Delegation during nearly the whole of the Peace Conference in Paris
William Barrett Montfort Bird, Founder of the Salters' Institute of Industrial Chemistry for providing scholarships for graduates in chemical science to enable them to continue research work
John Brown  Member of Aberdeen Town Council and of Aberdeen Harbour Board. Chairman of Aberdeen Steam Trawling and Fishing Company and Steam Herring Fleet. For public and local services.
Francis Morgan Bryant  Secretary of His Majesty's Private Secretary's Office, Buckingham Palace
Arthur Benjamin Bryceson, Town Clerk of Woolwich for over 18 years. For public and municipal services.
Major Gerald Arthur Fowler Burton. Raised considerable sums for Devonport War Hospital Supply Department and the Red Cross, and financed the Garrison Needlework Association during the War.
Robert Burton Chadwick  Director of Overseas Transport, Ministry of Munitions
Ernest Clark  Secretary of the Royal Commission on the Income Tax
His Honour Judge John Walker Craig  former Recorder of Belfast and County Court Judge of Antrim
Philip Dawson, Member of the Disposal Board, Ministry of Munitions
Joseph Dobbie, For public and local services in Edinburgh.
Major George Alexander Dolby, Mayor of Poole 1917-20, Chairman of Harbour Commissioners. For public and municipal services
Robert Henry Glanfield, President of Wholesale Clothing Manufacturers Federation. For public services in connection with the supply and manufacture of clothing for H.M. Forces. Honorary Treasurer of Borstal Association
Wemyss Grant-Wilson  Hon. Director of the Borstal Association and Director of the Central Association for the aid of convicts on discharge from Penal Servitude and Preventive Detention
Henry Gregg, Mayor of Tynemouth 1913-18; Member of Central Organisation for the County; Chairman of all local Organisations and Committees during the War. For public and municipal services.
Alderman Charles O'Brien Harding  Mayor of Eastbourne in 1903 and from 1916-1919
Edgar Josiah Harper  Chief Valuer, Inland Revenue Department
Professor James Blacklock Henderson  Professor of Applied Mechanics, Royal Naval College, Greenwich
Lieutenant-Colonel Maxwell Hicks  For personal work in organising the Devonshire House War Work.
Alderman James Peace Hinchliffe  Chairman of West Riding of Yorkshire County Council. Chiefly responsible for formation of British Research Association for Woollen and Worsted Industries.
Harry Hope, Member of Parliament for Stirling and Clackmannan, and formerly for Bute. President of Scottish Chamber of Agriculture 1908; Honorary President of National Farmers Union of Scotland; Member of Scottish Agricultural Commission, and of Departmental Committee appointed by the Secretary for Scotland to inquire into the poultry industry in Scotland.
Louis Stanley Johnson, Member of Parliament for East Walthamstow from 1918; Mayor of Hackney for the whole five years of the War. For invaluable public work.
Henry S. Keith  Provost of Hamilton
Walter Guy Coffin Kirkwood, late Secretary of Post Office, Edinburgh
Major Charles Mclver. For public services in Cheshire.
Major George Espec John Manners  Founder of the Boys Messenger Service
Samuel Meeson Morris, Mayor of Shrewsbury 1901-2 and 1916-18. Chairman of local Food Control Committee. For public and municipal services.
William Noble, Chief Engineer, General Post Office
William Payne Perry  Director of Finance, War Office
Ernest Roney, Solicitor. For public services.
George Royle, Mayor of Bedford 1903. Member of Town Council. For public and municipal services.
James Simpson  For public and local services in Edinburgh.
Albert Frederick Stephenson  For eminent public and local services in South Lancashire for over forty years.
Henry William Verey, late Official Referee of Supreme Court
William Henry Veno, President of Manchester Column Press Club. For public and local services.
William Howell Walters, For public and local services.
Alderman Zachariah Wheatley, Mayor of Abergavenny
James Lawton Wingate, President of the Royal Scottish Academy

British India
Colonel Hormasjee Eduljee Banatvala  Indian Medical Service (retired), late Inspector-General, Civil Hospitals, Assam
Diwan Bahadur Pitta Thyagaraya Chetti Garu, President of the Corporation, Madras
Walter Erskine Crum  Partner of Messrs. Graham and Company, Calcutta, Bengal
Henry Hubert Hayden  Director, Geological Survey of India
Abdul Karim Abdul Shakur Jamal  Merchant, Burma
Lallubhai Asharan Shah, Judge of the High Court, Bombay
Thomas Robert John Ward  Inspector-General of Irrigation, Punjab

Colonies, Protectorates, etc.
John Carruthers Beattie  Principal of the University of the Cape of Good Hope, Union of South Africa
The Hon. James Daniel Connolly, Agent-General for the State of Western Australia
Colin Rees Davies, Chief Justice of Bermuda
Lieutenant-Colonel Herman Melville Heyman, Member of the Legislative Council, Southern Rhodesia
The Hon. Joseph Henry Wood, Senior Puisne Judge of the Supreme Court of the State of Victoria
Major Edward Humphrey Manisty Leggett  Royal Engineers, Chairman East African Section, London Chamber of Commerce
Thomas Joseph Lennard, Vice-President of the Royal Colonial Institute
John Roberts  of the City of Dunedin, New Zealand
Henry Alexander Wickham, For services in connection with the rubber plantation industry in the Far East.
Jeremiah Wilson  lately Postmaster-General of the Union of South Africa

The Most Honourable Order of the Bath

Knight Grand Cross of the Order of the Bath (GCB)

Civil Division
The Rt. Hon. Sir John Andrew, Baron Sumner. For work in connection with the Peace Treaty, and as Chairman of the London Reparation Committee

Knight Commander of the Order of the Bath (KCB)

Military Division
Royal Navy
Vice-Admiral the Hon. Edward Stafford Fitzherbert  
Rear-Admiral Michael Culme-Seymour 

Army
Lieutenant-General Sir George Mark Watson Macdonogh  Adjutant-General to the Forces
Lieutenant-General Sir Travers Edwards Clarke  Quartermaster-General to the Forces

Royal Air Force
Rear-Admiral Cecil Foley Lambert, Director of Personnel, Air Ministry, and a Member of the Air Council
Air Vice-Marshal Edward Leonard Ellington  Director-General of Supply and Research Air Ministry, and a Member of the Air Council

Civil Division
Cecil James Barrington Hurst  Legal Adviser to the Foreign Office
Sir Alfred William Watson, Government Actuary and President of the Institute of Actuaries

Companion of the Order of the Bath (CB)

Military Division
Royal Navy
Vice-Admiral Cecil Spencer Hickley 
Rear-Admiral Henry Lancelot Mawbey
Surgeon Rear-Admiral George Albert Dreaper
Captain John Roderick Segrave 
Paymaster Captain Frederick Wilkin Iago Airey

Army
Major-General Charles William Grant Richardson  Deputy Quartermaster-General, India
Colonel Frederick James Moberley  Director of Military Operations, India
Lieutenant-Colonel and Brevet Colonel Harry Simonds de Brett  Assistant Adjutant-General
Lieutenant-Colonel Denis Paul  Royal Army Ordnance Corps

Royal Air Force
Lieutenant-Colonel James Grimwood

Civil Division
Alfred William Cope, Second Secretary, Ministry of Pensions
John Whelan Dulanty  Assistant Secretary, Ministry of Munitions
Alexander Flint, Assistant Secretary, Admiralty
Alfred William Flux, Assistant Secretary, Board of Trade
Henry Leon French  Assistant Secretary, Ministry of Agriculture
Herman Cameron Norman  British Minister, Teheran
Allan Paton, in Charge of Establishment at Hotel Majestic during the whole of Peace Conference
Henry Maunsel Richards, Chief Inspector of Elementary Schools, Board of Education
Charles Strachey, Principal Clerk, Colonial Office
Horace John Wilson  Principal Assistant Secretary, Ministry of Labour

The Most Exalted Order of the Star of India

Knight Commander (KCSI)
Sir George Stapylton Barnes  Ordinary Member of the Governor-General's Executive Council
Colonel Nawab Muhammad Nasrulla Khan, Heir-apparent to the Bhopal State, Central India

Companion (CSI)
William John Joseph Howley, Chief Engineer, Public Works Department, Madras
John Loader Maffey  Indian Civil Service, Chairman of the Corporation of Calcutta, Bengal
Charles Frederick Payne, Indian Civil Service, Chairman of the Corporation of Calcutta, Bengal
Jean Louis Rieu, Indian Civil Service, Bombay
Bertram Prior Standen  Indian Civil Service, Commissioner, Central Provinces and Berar

The Most Distinguished Order of Saint Michael and Saint George

Knight Grand Cross of the Order of St Michael and St George (GCMG)

The Rt. Hon. Sir John Newell Jordan  lately His Majesty's Envoy Extraordinary and Minister Plenipotentiary to the Republic of China

Knight Commander of the Order of St Michael and St George (KCMG)

Beilby Francis Alston  His Majesty's Envoy Extraordinary and Minister Plenipotentiary to the Republic of China
Geoffrey Francis Archer  Governor and Commander-in-Chief, Somaliland Protectorate
The Hon. William Elliot Johnson, Speaker of the House of Representatives, Commonwealth of Australia
The Hon. Sir Charles Gregory Wade  lately Agent-General for the State of New South Wales
Denison Samuel King Miller, Governor of the Commonwealth Bank of Australia

Honorary Knight Commander
His Highness Mohamed Jemalul Alam  Sultan of Brunei

Companion of the Order of St Michael and St George (CMG)
James Richard Collins, Secretary to the Department of the Treasury, Commonwealth of Australia
Crawford Douglas Douglas-Jones, Resident Commissioner in Southern and Northern Rhodesia
Joseph Adolphe Duclos, Member of the Council of Government, Mauritius
Walter Augustus Gale, Clerk of the House of Representatives, Commonwealth of Australia
Edward Blackwell Jarvis, Chief Secretary to the Government, Uganda Protectorate
James Comyn Macgregor, Resident Commissioner, Bechuanaland Protectorate
Hugh Charlie Marshall, Visiting Commissioner, Northern Rhodesia
Stephen Mills, Comptroller-General, Department of Trade and Customs, Commonwealth of Australia
Colonel Gerald Henry Summers, Deputy Commissioner and Officer Commanding the Troops, Somaliland Protectorate
Robert Gilbert Vansittart  Counsellor of Embassy in His Majesty's Diplomatic Service
William Frank Arthur Rattigan, First Secretary in His Majesty's Diplomatic Service
Commander Gerald Talbot  Naval Attaché to His Majesty's Legation at Athens

Honorary Companion
Sheikh Ali bin Salim  Assistant Liwali of Mombasa

The Most Eminent Order of the Indian Empire

Knight Commander (KCIE)
John Ghest Cumming  Indian Civil Service, Member of the Executive Council, Bengal
Capt. His Highness Nawab Taley Muhammad Khan Sher Muhammad Khan, Nawab of Palanpur, Bombay
Herbert John Maynard  Indian Civil Service, Financial Commissioner, Punjab

Companion (CIE)

Charles Turner Allen, Cooper, Allen & Co., Cawnpore, United Provinces
Lieutenant-Colonel Chetwynd Rokeby Alfred Bond  late Indian Staff Corps
Charles William Egerton Cotton, Indian Civil Service, Collector of Customs, Calcutta
William Patrick Cowie, Indian Civil Service, Private Secretary to the Governor of Bombay
Major Frederick Wernham Gerrard, Deputy Commissioner of Police, Basrah, Mesopotamia
Khan Bahadur Muhammad Habibulla Sahib Bahadur, Ex-Member of the Executive Council of Madras
Percy Harrison, Indian Civil Service, Junior Member, Board of Revenue, United Provinces
Major Francis Henry Humphrys, Indian Army, Political Agent, Khyber, North-West Frontier Province
Claud Mackenzie Hutchinson, Imperial Agricultural Bacteriologist
Cowasji Jehangir, Junior  President, Bombay Municipality
Charles Burdett La Touche, Manager, Jodhpur-Bikaner Railway, Rajputana
Babu Akshoy Kumar Maitra, President and Founder of the Varendra Research Society in Rajshahi, Bengal
Abdul Majid, Legal Remembrancer, Assam
Sorabji Bezonji Mehta, Manager, Empress Mills, Nagpur
Ralph Sneyd Pearson, Forest Economist, Research Institute, Dehra Dun
Winter Charles Renouf, Indian Civil Service, Political Agent, Bahawalpur Agency, Punjab
John Reid, Indian Civil Service, Reforms Officer, Bihar and Orissa
Edward Cheke Smalley Shuttleworth, Commissioner of Police, Rangoon, Burma
Khan Bahadur Raja Sifat Bahadur, Governor of Yasin, Gilgit Agency, Kashmir
Lieutenant-Colonel Ralph Verney, Rifle Brigade, Military Secretary to His Excellency the Viceroy

The Royal Victorian Order

Knight Grand Cross of the Royal Victorian Order (GCVO)
Arthur Henry John, Baron Ormathwaite 
Colonel the Honorary Sir Henry Charles Legge

Commander of the Royal Victorian Order (CVO)
Rowland Thomas, Earl of Cromer  (Dated 1 April 1920.)
Colonel the Hon. George Arthur Charles Crichton 
Sir Francis Henry Dent (Dated 31 March 1920.)
Percy Armytage 
Lieutenant-Colonel John Mackenzie-Rogan  (Dated 30 March 1920)

Member of the Royal Victorian Order, 4th class (MVO)
Major George Gooding

The Most Excellent Order of the British Empire

Knight Grand Cross of the Order of the British Empire (GBE)

Civil Division
Sir Percy Elly Bates  Voluntary services to the Ministry of Shipping for five years
Sir John Lorne MacLeod  Lord Provost of Edinburgh throughout the War
Lieutenant-Colonel Sir Thomas Bilbe Robinson  Agent-General for Queensland until end of 1919. For services to Board of Trade in connection with purchase and distribution of frozen meat for Allied Forces

Diplomatic Service and Overseas List

Dame Commander of the Order of the British Empire (DBE)

Violet Florence Mabel, Lady Mond. Services in connection with her hospital at Melchet
Ethel Maud, Lady Pearson. Services in connection with St. Dunstan's Hostel for the Blind

Knight Commander of the Order of the British Empire (KBE)

Civil Division

John Apsey  Royal Corps of Naval Constructors. Manager of Constructive Department at Portsmouth for past twelve years
Frederick William Bowater. For Services rendered to Ministry of Information
Howard D'Egville  Secretary to Empire Parliamentary Association
James Duncan Elliot, Engineer Adviser to New Zealand Dominion Government Member of Industrial Court
The Hon. William Finlay  Chairman of Contraband Committee; Legal Adviser to Foreign Office during Peace Conference
James Dundas-Grant  Eminent aural specialist
Lieutenant-Colonel Henry Mulleneux Grayson  Director of Ship Repairs, Ministry of Shipping
Ernest Musgrave Harvey  Chief Cashier, Bank of England
Vesey George Mackenzie Holt  Senior Partner of Messrs. Holt & Co., Bankers
Arnold Lawson  For voluntary medical and surgical work at St. Dunstan's Hostel for the Blind
William Henry Peat, Financial Secretary to Ministry of Food, 1917-1920
Philip Bridger Proctor Director of Meat Supplies, Ministry of Food
Josiah Charles Stamp  For valuable services rendered to the Government in connection with financial and economic problems
Colonel William Taylor  Ex-President of Royal College of Surgeons in Ireland
Alexander Walker. For services rendered to Ministry of Munitions in the disposal of surplus war material
Temp. Brigadier-General Arthur John Allen-Williams, For Machine Gun Work in connection with military transport at the Port of Richborough

Kaisar-i-Hind Medal
First Class
Diwan Bahadur Tirumalai Desika Achariyar Avargal, President of the Trinchopoly District Board, Madras
Gopal Krishna Devdhar, Bombay
Reverend Father Matthews, Head of the Belgian Mission High School, Dalwal, Jhelum District, Punjab
The Reverend John McNeel, Missionary of the Church of Scotland, Seoul, Central Provinces
Dhanjibhai Hormasji Mehta, Medical Officer, Patao Hospital, Baroda
Olive Monahan, Madras
Shamrao Ramrao Moolgavkar, Principal
Medical Officer, Bikaner State, Rajputana
Reverend Mother Sacramento Clara Plamondon, Sister in St. Joseph's Leper Asylum, Burma
Ambalal Sarabhai, Ahmedabad, Bombay
Millicent Vere Webb, Lady Superintendent, Dufferin Victoria Hospital, Calcutta, Bengal

King's Police Medal (KPM)

British India
Nurzali, Fourth Grade Inspector;
Nur Mohammed, Third Grade Mounted Constable, both of the North-West Frontier Police;
Mohammed Hasan, Constable;
Lai Shahgul, Constable;
Hari Singh, Head Constable; and
Gul Mohammed, Mounted Head Constable, all of the Zhob and Loralai Police, on account of special services rendered on the North-West Frontier, in the Zhob Valley, and in Baluchistan during July and August, 1919, and January, 1920

Imperial Service Order (ISO)
Home Civil Service

Richard Bullen Newton, Assistant in Department of Geology, British Museum
Arthur Robert Dawson  Collector of Customs and Excise, Cardiff
Frederick Pullen, Postmaster-Surveyor, Glasgow
Charles Proctor, FIC Superintending Analyst, Department of the Government Chemist
George Edward Ambrose, Chief Clerk, National Gallery
William Ragle Clark  Keeper of Natural History Department, Royal Scottish Museum, Scottish Education Department
Robert Duncan, Staff Officer, Veterinary Branch, Department of Agriculture and Technical Instruction, Ireland

Overseas Dominions
D'Arcy Wentworth Addison, Under Secretary for Tasmania
Thomas Noel Brodrick  Under Secretary of the Lands and Survey Department, New Zealand
Henry Carr, Resident of the Colony of Nigeria
Edwin Tiptree Drake, Secretary for Public Works, Victoria
Benjamin Harry Friend, Principal Parliamentary Reporter, Commonwealth of Australia
Joseph Peascod Harper, Surveyor-General, Federated Malay States
William James Mackay, Chief Collector of Customs, Cyprus
Richard Horton O'Dwyer, Commissioner of Public Charities, Newfoundland
Malcolm Lindsay Shepherd, Secretary, Prime Minister's Department, Commonwealth of Australia
Percival Stevens, Inspector of Mines, Trinidad

Indian Civil Service

Arthur Miller, Second Class Clerk, Higher Grade, in the India Office Library
William Ernest Mitchell, Superintendent, Central Jail, Vellore, Madras
M. R. Ry. Diwaoa Bahadur Pasupuleti Parankusam Nayudu, Deputy Commissioner of Police, Madras
Ethelbert Edward Thomas, Superintendent, Central Jail, Nagpur, Central Provinces
Raj Bahadur Pandit Brij Jiwan Lai, Extra Assistant Commissioner, Merwara, Ajmer-Merwara
Lieutenant James William Fairley, Superintendent, Civil Commissioner's Office, Baghdad
Raj Bahadur Prasanna Kumar Basu, Registrar, Reforms Office
Joseph Lilly de Vine, Nagpur
Raj Sahib Mahendra Nath Bhattacharji, Personal Assistant to the Surgeon to the Governor of Bengal
Richard Arnold Matthews, Superintendent, Provincial Civil Secretariat, Punjab
Khan Biahadur Ghulam Yasim Ghulam Mustapha, Director of the Pritchard Salt Works, Kharaghoda, Bombay

Imperial Service Medal (ISM)
British India
Goodoo Miah Muhammad Ghouse, late Council Dubash, Chief Secretariat, Fort St. George, Madras
Mohamed Jaffar Ghulam Dastagir, Chief Laboratory Attendant, Office of the Government Agricultural Chemist, Madras
Egambaram Rangaswami Doss, late Chief Attendant, Medical College, Madras
Narayan Ramji Katke, late Naik in the Office of the Executive Engineer, Foona District, Bombay
Pampamiya Sayad Mir, late Chaukidar in the Ahmednagar District, Bombay
Prayagdin, late Forest Guard, Central Provinces

References

Birthday Honours
1920 awards
1920 in Australia
1920 in Canada
1920 in India
1920 in New Zealand
1920 in the United Kingdom